Pagadian Airport (Cebuano: Tugpahanan sa Pagadian; Chavacano: Aeropuerto de Pagadian) , classified Principal Airport Class 1 or major domestic by the Civil Aviation Authority of the Philippines (CAAP), is the airport serving the city of Pagadian, the rest of the province of Zamboanga del Sur, and the province of Zamboanga Sibugay in the Philippines. The CAAP is the arm of the Department of Transportation which operates all the airports in the Philippines except the major international airports.

The airport is located approximately 5 kilometers from the city center and is situated in Barangays Muricay and Tiguma in Pagadian.

Airlines and destinations

Renovation and re-opening

In 2006, the airport underwent a PHP 379.46 million-worth (US$8.72 million) rehabilitation and facility upgrade and was completed in December 2009.

On October 9, 2009, President Gloria Macapagal Arroyo inaugurated the renovated airport. The first aircraft to land on the rehabilitated runway was a Fokker 70 of the Philippine Air Force carrying the Presidential Security Group (PSG) followed by a chartered Dornier 328 of the Royal Star Aviation with tail number RP-C8328 carrying the presidential entourage. The chartered jet from San Miguel Corporation with tail number RP-C8576 which served as the presidential jet was last to land.

The airport officially recommenced commercial operation on April 27, 2010, accommodating the first Cebu Pacific flight from Cebu City to Pagadian. The same airline also sent a plane from Manila to Pagadian on June 9, 2010, which commenced the airline's Pagadian to/from Manila flight offering.

Under Aquino's PPP program, the airport was entitled to a 42 million subsidy for upgrading of its facilities. This includes extension of runway, widening of taxiway, rehabilitation and improvement of passenger terminal building, improvement and expansion of vehicular parking area, construction of drainage system, and construction of perimeter fence.

See also
List of airports in the Philippines

References

External links
Pagadian.org - Pagadian Airport Almost Done

Airports in the Philippines
Buildings and structures in Pagadian
Transportation in Mindanao